Vi Khi Nao is a cross-genre writer from Long Khánh, Vietnam. She is a graduate of the MFA program at Brown University, where she received the John Hawkes Prize, the Feldman Prize and the Kim Ann Arstark Memorial Award. She was the 2022 recipient of Lambda Literary's Jim Duggins, PhD Outstanding Mid-Career Novelist Prize.

She won FC2’s Ronald Sukenick Innovative Fiction Prize in 2016 for her short story collection, A Brief Alphabet of Torture. Her poetry collection, The Old Philosopher, won the Nightboat Books Prize for Poetry in 2014.

Sheep Machine is an ekphrastic work written in response to Leslie Thornton's film of the same name. It was featured in The Paris Review as one of Sabrina Orah Mark's favorite books of 2019. It was also a Staff Pick at Small Press Distribution and Drawn & Quarterly. PEN America calls it "A puzzle of a book that challenges the very way we read and consider words."

She has been a semi-regular contributor to the literary annual NOON since 2011.

Bibliography 
 The Vegas Dilemma (11:11 Press, 2021)
A Bell Curve Is a Pregnant Straight Line (11:11 Press, 2021)
Human Tetris (with Ali Raz) (11:11 Press, 2019)
 Sheep Machine (Black Sun Lit, 2018)
 Umbilical Hospital (Press 1913, 2017)
 A Brief Alphabet of Torture (Fiction Collective Two 2016)
 Fish in Exile (Coffee House Press, 2016)
 The Old Philosopher (Nightboat Books, 2014)

References 

Year of birth missing (living people)
Living people
Brown University alumni
Vietnamese women writers
21st-century Vietnamese women